Girl on Guy is an audio podcast launched in 2011 by Aisha Tyler, in which she interviews various celebrities about their lives and careers. Self-described as "guy-centric", the podcast is a show about "stuff guys love", namely "culture, booze, comedy, family, physical injuries, psychological bruises, action movies, rock music, ninjas, zombies, failure, success, sacrifice, video games, and blowing shit up." In 2012 the podcast passed the milestone of four million downloads. Tyler's book Self-inflicted wounds is drawn from a segment on the podcast wherein guests discuss mistakes they made earlier in life. Although Girl on Guy is one of the several jobs Tyler juggles, she posits that the benefit of podcast hosting is that fans "become evangelists for you."

Tyler both records and produces the podcast herself using Shure microphones and Final Cut Pro. The podcast was nominated in 2012 as one of Stitcher's best new podcasts and was recognized as iTunes best new comedy podcast of 2013. The podcast was also 2013 recipient of a Webby Award in the field of radio and podcasts.

Episode list

Season 1

Season 2

Season 3

Season 4

Season 5

References

External links
 

Audio podcasts
2011 podcast debuts
Comedy and humor podcasts
2016 podcast endings